The University of Zambia Pacers, better known as UNZA Pacers, is a Zambian basketball team based in Lusaka. The team plays in the Midlands Basketball Association (MBA). It is the basketball section of the University of Zambia.

Representing Zambia, the Pacers played in the qualifying tournaments for the inaugural BAL season. The Pacers finished second in Group E to advance to the Elite 16.

Honours
Zambia Basketball League
Champions: 2013, 2018

In African competitions
BAL Qualifiers (1 appearance)
2020 – First Round

References

Basketball teams in Zambia
Pacers
Road to BAL teams